Yunyang County is a county in the northeast of Chongqing Municipality, China, bordering Hubei province to the south.

In eastern Chongqing is Yunyang County with over 1,400 years of history and a reputation as the 'Bright Pearl of Chongqing'. The county abounds with natural resources, beautiful landscapes and historical relics. The culture of Ba (the ancient name of Chongqing), salt culture and the culture of the Migrants from Three Gorges area can be learned in this area.
The scenery here is rich. Mountain, river, valley, cave and ancient architecture can be seen here. Zhang Fei Temple, which is regarded as a wonderful historic relic of the Yangtze River area is a must. It was built in memory of Zhang Fei, a general of the Three Kingdoms Period (220 - 280). The temple, with over 1,700 years' of history is visited by numerous tourists from home and abroad every year. It has been a hotspot for Yangtze River Cruises.

Because of the Three Gorges Dam Project, territories of Yunyang County have been submerged. The whole county and its local people have moved to the new county of Yunyang. Located at Shuangjiang Town on the northern bank of the Yangtze River, the new county is 162 miles from the Three Gorges Dam and 223 miles from Chongqing City. It is the county that has moved the longest distance among the migrating counties and cities during the Three Gorges Project.

Together with the people, Zhang Fei Temple, which is the hot scenic spot here has also been moved to Panshi Town which is opposite the New Town of Yunyang.

After years of construction, Yunyang has developed quickly and now has over 150 thousand local residences. The museum presenting the culture of the Migrants from the Three Gorges area has been built. Now, it has become a city with a good environment, well-developed communication and rich tourism resources.

History
In 314 BC, Juren County (朐忍县) was established in Qin state. In 568 AD, the county seat was moved to the site of modern Yunyang Town, and the county was renamed Yun'an (云安县). In 1283, the county was replaced by Yunyang Prefecture (云阳州). In 1373, the prefecture was downgraded to a county. In 1999, the county seat was moved from the now-submerged Yunyang Town to Shuangjiang Town (双江镇).

Industrial Zone
Hong Shan Chuan Industry Ltd.

Transportation
Yunyang has one Yangtze River crossing, the Yunyang Yangtze River Bridge.

Education
As of 2015 the county has 138 schools. In 2005 there were 482 schools. In a ten-year period the number of students in the county declined by 42,000.

As of 2015 there are seven schools in Jianquan Township. Sixin Village School and one other school both have one student each; the teacher at Sixin Village School that year was Xiang Guozheng. Around 2007 Sixin Village school had over 100 students, and its smallest class had 9 students.

Students are required to attend larger schools beginning in grade 5.

Climate

References

External links
 Yunyang
 http://www.travelchinaguide.com/river/yangtze_attraction/yunyang.htm

 
County-level divisions of Chongqing